The 2015–16 season was Barnsley's second consecutive season in League One following their relegation from the Championship in the 2013–14 season. Along with League One, the club also competed in the FA Cup, League Cup and Football League Trophy. The season covered the period from 1 July 2015 to 30 June 2016.

Barnsley were promoted to the Football League Championship, after beating Millwall 3–1 in the play-off final.  Barnsley also won the Football League Trophy, after beating Oxford United 3–2 in the final.

Squad

Statistics

|-
|colspan=14|Players who returned to their parent club:

|-
|colspan=14|Players who left the club:

|}

Play-off Appearances

|}

Goals record

Disciplinary record

Contracts

Transfers

Transfers in

Transfers out

Total income:  £2,000,000

Loans in

Loans out

Competitions

Pre-season friendlies

Football League One

League table

Matches

League One play-offs

League Cup

Football League Trophy

FA Cup

Overall summary

Summary

Score overview

References

Barnsley F.C. seasons
Barnsley